George Baker (1687–1772) was the Archdeacon of Totnes from 1740 until 1772.

He was the son of Aaron Baker (born 1652), Rector of Alvingham. George became vicar of Modbury, Devon. He married Mary, the daughter of Stephen Weston, Bishop of Exeter. Their son George became a physician and later a baronet.

References

1687 births
1772 deaths
Archdeacons of Totnes